Aleksandr Vasilievich Kuligin (born 5 February 1991 in Dzerzhinsk) is a Russian football defender. He was the captain of the Russian team that won gold medals at the 2012 Summer Paralympics.

References

External links
 

1991 births
Living people
Paralympic 7-a-side football players of Russia
Paralympic gold medalists for Russia
Paralympic medalists in football 7-a-side
7-a-side footballers at the 2012 Summer Paralympics
Medalists at the 2012 Summer Paralympics
People from Dzerzhinsk, Russia
Sportspeople from Nizhny Novgorod Oblast
21st-century Russian people